Bloomfield is a historic home located at St. Georges, New Castle County, Delaware.  It was built in 1828, and is a -story, five bay frame dwelling.  It has an asymmetrical floor plan, steeply pitched cross-gable roof, deep one-story verandah, and is in the Gothic Revival style.

It was added to the National Register of Historic Places in 1982.

References

Houses on the National Register of Historic Places in Delaware
Gothic Revival architecture in Delaware
Houses completed in 1828
Houses in New Castle County, Delaware
National Register of Historic Places in New Castle County, Delaware